Samson Reinhart (born November 6, 1995) is a Canadian professional ice hockey player for the Florida Panthers of the National Hockey League (NHL). Reinhart was selected second overall by the Buffalo Sabres in the 2014 NHL Entry Draft.

Reinhart was selected 15th overall by the Kootenay Ice in the 2010 WHL Bantam Draft. Reinhart was a member of the Ed Chynoweth Cup-winning team in the 2010–11 season. He was awarded the Jim Piggott Memorial Trophy in 2011–12, having been the league's top rookie that season. Along with Max and Griffin, he is one of three hockey-playing brothers, and are the sons of former National Hockey League (NHL) All-Star Paul Reinhart. Reinhart was ranked fourth on NHL Central Scouting Bureau's 2014 midterm rankings for North American skaters.

Reinhart has represented Canada at five International Ice Hockey Federation (IIHF) sanctioned events, two at the under-18 level, two at the world junior level, and one at the IIHF Men's World Championship. He won gold in 2016, gold in 2015 and bronze in 2012 at the under-18 level. Additionally, Reinhart represented Canada Pacific at the 2012 World U-17 Hockey Challenge and Canada at the 2012 Ivan Hlinka Memorial Tournament.

Early life
Reinhart was born in North Vancouver to Theresa and Paul Reinhart. His father was a National Hockey League (NHL) defenceman, and is now a stock market financier and promoter. Reinhart wore jersey number 23, the same number that his father wore in the NHL, while in Buffalo. He now wears number 13 for the Florida Panthers. Sam has two brothers: Max and Griffin. Max was selected in the third-round in 2010 NHL Entry Draft by the Calgary Flames and plays in their organization. Sam played alongside Max on the Ice's Ed Chynoweth Cup-championship team in the 2010–11 Western Hockey League (WHL) season as well as the 2011–12 season. Griffin was selected fourth-overall in the 2012 draft by the New York Islanders, and has played against Sam's Ice with the Edmonton Oil Kings in the WHL since 2011–12.

Growing up in West Vancouver, Reinhart attended Collingwood School. He also played tennis in high school, and still plays the sport in the offseason. Besides ice hockey and tennis, Reinhart played baseball, lacrosse and soccer, and considers himself a huge soccer fan.

Playing career

Minor
Reinhart played minor ice hockey at the Hollyburn Country Club in West Vancouver. He started out as a defenceman, but eventually ended up as a centre. From there, he went on to play for the Vancouver Northwest Giants of the BC Hockey Major Midget League (BCMML). In his first and only full season with the Northwest Giants, Reinhart tallied up 38 goals along with 40 assists. With the Northwest Giants, Reinhart won the 2010–11 BCMML championship and finished fourth in the 2011 Telus Cup. In the Telus Cup, he received the Top Scorer and Top Forward awards. Reinhart also participated in the 2011 Canada Winter Games midway through the 2010–11 season, winning gold with the British Columbia U16 team.

Junior
The Kootenay Ice selected Reinhart 15th overall in the 2010 WHL Bantam Draft. He was selected three rounds ahead of oldest brother Max when he was drafted in 2007 and was selected 12 positions behind as Griffin when he was drafted third-overall in 2010. Reinhart joined the Kootenay Ice for four games in the 2010–11 season. In his first WHL game, he scored the game-winning goal against the Edmonton Oil Kings. That was also the first WHL game in which all three Reinhart brothers were playing. Reinhart suited up for seven WHL playoffs games, registering zero points in the process, as part of the Ice's Ed Chynoweth Cup championship team. He played one game for the Ice in the 2011 Memorial Cup.

In the 2011–12, Reinhart registered 62 points, which put him behind only his brother Max in team scoring. His 28 goals tied for the Ice lead, and were the most by any 16-year-old rookie in the WHL, while his 62 points put him fourth among all WHL rookies in that category. Due to his excellent play in his first full season, Reinhart was awarded the Jim Piggott Memorial Trophy as the top rookie in the WHL.

In his second full WHL season, Reinhart was selected to represent the WHL for one game in his hometown Vancouver for the annual 2012 Subway Super Series against Russia; he scored the game-winning shootout goal. Reinhart scored his first hat-trick on January 27, 2012, against the Prince Albert Raiders. He finished his second full WHL season leading the Ice in goals (35), assists (50) and points (85). He was named into the WHL Eastern Conference Second All-Star Team. On April 2, 2013, Reinhart was named captain of the Ice for the 2013-14 WHL season.

On October 9, 2013, Reinhart registered an assist in a game against the Lethbridge Hurricanes, which tied him with John Negrin for the Ice' franchise record for most consecutive games with an assist (8). Reinhart played in the 2013 Subway Super Series for the WHL, and was the captain for the latter of the two games. In his second Subway Super Series, he registered one assist. Reinhart had a goal and an assist in the 2014 CHL/NHL Top Prospects Game while playing as captain for Team Cherry; Team Cherry lost to Team Orr 4–3. Reinhart's father Paul was one of the assistant coaches for Team Cherry.

Professional

Buffalo Sabres
Reinhart was selected with the second pick of the 2014 NHL Entry Draft by the Buffalo Sabres. On July 12, 2014, he was signed to a three-year entry-level contract with the Sabres. Reinhart made the Sabres' opening day roster in the 2014–15 season. He scored his first NHL point on October 25, 2014, assisting on a goal by Nicolas Deslauriers in a 2–1 victory over the San Jose Sharks. He was returned to Kootenay after appearing in nine games with the Sabres and joined the Rochester Americans after the Ice's season ended.

Reinhart scored his first career NHL hat-trick on January 10, 2016, against the Winnipeg Jets in a 4–2 victory. On September 19, 2018, Reinhart re-signed with the Sabres to a two-year contract worth $7.3 million.

On October 25, 2020, Reinhart signed a one-year, $5.2 million contract with the Sabres.

Florida Panthers
On July 24, 2021, Reinhart was traded by the Sabres to the Florida Panthers in exchange for Devon Levi and a 2022 first-round pick. On August 11, Reinhart signed a three-year, $19.5 million contract with the Panthers.

International play

Reinhart competed for Canada Pacific in the 2012 World U-17 Hockey Challenge, but failed to medal. Later that year, he was selected to join Canada's under-18 team for the 2012 IIHF World U18 Championships in the Czech Republic. The team lost to the United States in the semi-finals, but won the bronze medal game against Finland in overtime. Reinhart then captained the under-18 team at the 2012 Ivan Hlinka Memorial Tournament as Canada won its fifth consecutive gold medal in the event. Reinhart again captained the U18 team at the 2013 IIHF World U18 Championships in Sochi, Russia. Reinhart scored three goals and four assists to help Canada win the gold, ending the United States' record of four consecutive championships.

Moving up to the U20 level, Reinhart earned a spot with the national junior team for the 2014 World Junior Championships. His brother Griffin also made the team, and they became the third pair of brothers to play for Canada at the World Junior Championships. Reinhart and Aaron Ekblad were the only two players on the Canadian roster eligible for the 2014 NHL Entry Draft. Reinhart registered two goals and three assists in the first three games of the tournament, but was held scoreless for the remainder of the tournament. Canada lost the bronze medal game against Russia 2–1 and finished fourth. Sam Reinhart also represented Team Canada at the 2015 World Junior Ice Hockey Championship. The team won gold as Sam served as one of two alternate captains for the team, the other being Connor McDavid. Reinhart scored the game-winning goal against team Russia in the gold medal game, which was his fifth of the tournament. Reinhart finished with a total of 5 goals and 11 points leading all players in goals and points. 

Reinhart represented Team Canada at the 2016 IIHF World Championship helping win Gold and finishing the tournament with four assists in 10 games.

On April 29, 2019, Reinhart was named to the Team Canada roster for the 2019 IIHF World Championship held in Slovakia. Reinhart helped Canada progress through to the playoff rounds before losing the final to Finland to finish with the Silver Medal on May 26, 2019. He finished the tournament posting 3 goals and 5 points in 10 games.

Personal life 
In an interview on WGR Sports Radio 550AM, Reinhart stated he prefers to be called "Samson" as opposed to "Sam". Samson's nickname with the Sabres (and 2015 WJC linemate Max Domi) is "Reino." He chose the number 23 as his jersey number for Buffalo, the same number his father Paul Reinhart wore during his NHL tenure.

Career statistics

Regular season and playoffs

International

Awards and honours

Records
 Kootenay Ice franchise record; most consecutive games with an assist – 8 (tied with John Negrin)

References

External links
 
 Sam Reinhart's player profile at Western Hockey League

1995 births
Living people
Buffalo Sabres draft picks
Buffalo Sabres players
Canadian ice hockey centres
Florida Panthers players
Ice hockey people from British Columbia
Kootenay Ice players
National Hockey League first-round draft picks
Rochester Americans players
Sportspeople from North Vancouver